The 31st New York Infantry Regiment, "Baxter's Light Guard" or the "Montezuma Regiment", was an infantry regiment that served in the Union Army during the American Civil War.

Service
The regiment was organized in New York City, New York,  and was mustered in for a two-year enlistment on May 14, 1861.

The regiment was mustered out of service on June 4, 1863, and those men who had signed three year enlistments or who re-enlisted were transferred to the 121st New York on April 19, 1864.

Total strength and casualties
The regiment suffered 6 officers and 62 enlisted men who were killed in action or mortally wounded and 3 officers and 1 officer and 29 enlisted men who died of disease, for a total of 98 fatalities.

Commanders
Colonel Calvin Edward Pratt

See also
List of New York Civil War regiments

Notes

References
The Civil War Archive

External links
New York State Military Museum and Veterans Research Center - Civil War - 31st Infantry Regiment History, photographs, table of battles and casualties, and historical sketch for the 31st New York Infantry Regiment.

Infantry 031
1861 establishments in New York (state)
Military units and formations established in 1861
Military units and formations disestablished in 1863